The men's qualification for football tournament at the 2007 All-Africa Games.

Qualification stage

Zone 1 (North Africa)

|}

Tunisia qualified; in addition, Algeria qualify as hosts

Zone 2 (West Africa 1)
First round

|}

Second round

|}

Senegal qualified.

Zone 3 (West Africa 2)
First round

|}

Second round

|}

Ghana qualified.

Zone 4 (Central Africa)
First round

|}

Second round

|}

Third round

|}

Cameroon qualified.

Zone 5 (East Africa)
First round

|}

Second round

|}

Egypt qualified.

Zone 6 (Southern Africa)
First round

|}

Second round

|}

Third round

|}

Zambia and South Africa qualified.

Zone 7 (Indian Ocean)
No matches took place, two teams qualify from Zone 6.

Qualified teams
The following eight teams qualified for the final tournament.

References

External links
2007 All-Africa Games – Men's tournament - rsssf.com

qualification
2007